Lone Star Ranger is a 1942 American Western film directed by James Tinling and written by William Conselman Jr., Irving Cummings Jr. and George Kane. The film stars John Kimbrough, Sheila Ryan, Jonathan Hale, William Farnum, Truman Bradley and George E. Stone. The film was released on March 20, 1942, by 20th Century Fox. It was the fourth and final film adaptation of the novel of the same name by Zane Grey. William Farnum had appeared in the first adaptation of the novel, a 1919 silent film of the same name. In that version he had starred in the leading role, which was named "Steele", who avenged the murder of Major McNeil, which is the role he plays in this film.

Plot

Cast   
 John Kimbrough as Buck Duane
 Sheila Ryan as Barbara Longstreth
 Jonathan Hale as Judge [John] Longstreth
 William Farnum as Major McNeil
 Truman Bradley as Phil Lawson
 George E. Stone as Euchre
 Russell Simpson as Tom Duane
 Dorothy Burgess as Trixie
 Tom Fadden as Sam
 Fred Kohler Jr. as Red [Morgan]
 Eddy C. Waller as Clem Mitchell
 Harry Hayden as Sheriff
 George Melford as Jim Hardin
 Tom London as Fletcher
 Eva Puig as Maria
 Jeff Corey as Clerk
 Robert Homans as Bartender
 Herbert Ashley as Bartender
 Alec Craig as Mr. Strong
 Almira Sessions as Mrs. Strong
 Syd Saylor as Hotel clerk

References

External links 
 

1942 films
20th Century Fox films
American Western (genre) films
1942 Western (genre) films
Films directed by James Tinling
American black-and-white films
1940s English-language films
1940s American films